The 2018 PDC Nordic & Baltic ProTour consisted of 10 darts tournaments on the 2018 PDC Pro Tour.

Prize money
The prize money for each of the Nordic & Baltic ProTour events had a prize fund of €5,000.

This is how the prize money is divided:

January

Nordic & Baltic ProTour 1
ProTour 1 was contested on Saturday 27 January 2018 at the Hotel Park Inn by Radisson in Copenhagen, Denmark.

Nordic & Baltic ProTour 2
ProTour 2 was contested on Sunday 28 January 2018 at the Hotel Park Inn by Radisson in Copenhagen, Denmark.

February

Nordic & Baltic ProTour 3
ProTour 3 was contested on Saturday 24 February 2018 at the Panorama Hotel in Vilnius, Lithuania.

Nordic & Baltic ProTour 4
ProTour 4 was contested on Sunday 25 February 2018 at the Panorama Hotel in Vilnius, Lithuania.

May

Nordic & Baltic ProTour 5
ProTour 5 was contested on Saturday 26 May 2018 at the Hotelli Tallukka in Vääksy, Finland.

Nordic & Baltic ProTour 6
ProTour 6 was contested on Sunday 27 May 2018 at the Hotelli Tallukka in Vääksy, Finland.

August

Nordic & Baltic ProTour 7
ProTour 7 was contested on Saturday 11 August 2018 at the Apple Hotel & Konferens in Gothenburg, Sweden.

Nordic & Baltic ProTour 8
ProTour 8 was contested on Sunday 12 August 2018 at the Apple Hotel & Konferens in Gothenburg, Sweden.

October

Nordic & Baltic ProTour 9
ProTour 9 was contested on Saturday 6 October 2018 at the City Park Hotel in Reykjavík, Iceland.

Nordic & Baltic ProTour 10
ProTour 10 was contested on Sunday 7 October 2018 at the City Park Hotel in Reykjavík, Iceland.

References

2018 in darts
2018 PDC Pro Tour